The Dominican Republic competed at the 2000 Summer Olympics in Sydney, Australia.  No Dominican athletes were medalists in any events.

Athletics

Men
Track & road events

Boxing

Judo

Men

Women

Swimming

Men

Weightlifting

References

Official Olympic Reports
sports-reference

Nations at the 2000 Summer Olympics
2000
Olympics